Iroquois Falls Airport  is located  west southwest of Iroquois Falls, Ontario, Canada.

References

Registered aerodromes in Cochrane District